"Raise the Alarm" is a song by Australian rock band The Living End, released on 22 December 2008. It is the second track and third single from their album White Noise. A music video was released containing footage of the band performing live throughout the band's White Noise tour and footage of their recording sessions. The single was released on iTunes on 27 February 2009.

Track listing 
All tracks written by Chris Cheney.
"Raise the Alarm" – 3:37
"Faith" (Demo) – 2:38

Charts

References 

2009 singles
Songs critical of religion
The Living End songs
2008 songs
Dew Process singles
Songs written by Chris Cheney